Sky Cinema is an Italian set of premium movie channels owned by Sky Italia.

Channels
The Sky Cinema package includes eleven Sky Italia-branded channels and four Mediaset Premium-branded channels.

Sky Cinema Uno
Sky Cinema Uno is the flagship channel. This channel shows the first viewing of films after there time in cinema that Sky have the rights to. Until November 4, 2016, it was called Sky Cinema 1.

Sky Cinema Uno +24
Sky Cinema Uno +24 retransmits the schedule of the Sky Cinema Uno channel 24 hours after the main channel. Until December 20, 2008, it was called Sky Cinema 3, later becoming Sky Cinema +24. Following the Sky #IoRestoACasa initiative, from April 4 to May 26, 2020, the channel is renamed to Sky Cinema #IoRestoACasa 1 and from May 27 to June 30, 2020, it was renamed to Sky Cinema per te 1.

Sky Cinema Due
Sky Cinema Due, formerly known as Sky Cinema Cult, Cult and Cult Network Italia, is the channel dedicated to cinema d'author and to independent productions. It has been managed by Sky Cinema since August 2011.

Sky Cinema Due +24
Sky Cinema Due +24, born on March 8, 2019, retransmits the schedule of the Sky Cinema Due channel postponed by 24 hours. Following the Sky #IoRestoACasa initiative, from April 4 to May 26, 2020, the channel is renamed to Sky Cinema #IoRestoACasa 2 while from May 27 to June 30, 2020, it will be renamed to Sky Cinema per te 2.

From August 12, to September 17, 2020, the channel became Sky Cinema per te.

Sky Cinema Collection
Sky Cinema Collection was born on March 1, 2008, as Sky Cinema Hits. It was also formerly Sky Cinema 16:9 which broadcast in the then new 16:9 ratio.

Under the current name, the channel is dedicated to film reviews and collections/ franchises including:

 Sky Cinema Christmas each year for Christmas, it broadcasts Christmas-themed films.
 Sky Cinema 007 started for the 50th anniversary of the first James Bond film (Agent 007 - License to kill) and subsequently revived each year each, it broadcasts all James Bond films.
 Sky Cinema Oscars each year around the Night of the Oscars, broadcasts films that have received at least one Oscar.

And occasionally becomes:
 Sky Cinema Star Wars,  films and documentaries.
 Sky Cinema Princesses broadcasts films related to Disney Princess.
 Sky Cinema Wedding 
 Sky Cinema Saga of the Ring, broadcasts  The Lord of the Rings and The Hobbit saga films.
 Sky Cinema Heroes broadcasts superhero films Marvel and DC.
 Sky Cinema Disney Pixar broadcasts Disney Pixar movies.
 Sky Cinema David di Donatello On the occasion of the David di Donatello, it broadcasts all the winning films of the David di Donatello.
 Sky Cinema 3D Vintage broadcast the 22 most important films in the history of cinema.
 Sky Cinema Rocky broadcasts all films in the  Rocky  film series.
 Sky Cinema  Planet of the Apes
 Sky Cinema Shrek broadcasts all the films of the saga of Shrek.
 Sky Cinema Disney Pirates of the Caribbean
 Sky Cinema Women Collection
 Sky Cinema Agatha Christie with films based on the novels of the British writer.
 Sky Cinema Sergio Leone with a review of films directed by the director thirty years after his death.
  Sky Cinema Back to the Future
 Sky Cinema Spider-Man
 Sky cinema Men in Black broadcasts Men in Black films.
 Sky Cinema DreamWorks broadcasts DreamWorks Animation films.
 Sky Cinema Sci-Fi broadcasts films of sci-fi genre.

Sky Cinema Family
Sky Cinema Family started airing on the December 20, 2008, broadcasting films of different genres each day including: comedies, animated films, teen-comedies, blockbusters and films from the eighties and nineties. There will be a female audience each Friday in prime time and cycles focusing on the stars of Hollywood. From April 1, 2010, broadcasts in HD begin. From December 3, 2011, to June 30, 2019, each weekend broadcast, the channel time shared with Disney Cinemagic.

Sky Cinema Action
Sky Cinema Action, formerly Sky Cinema Max, is the channel that mainly offering action films. These include science fiction, horror, espionage, thriller in themed cycles. From July 20, 2009, is also available in HD.

Sky Cinema Suspense
Sky Cinema Suspense is the channel dedicated to thriller, crime, horror and noir films.

Sky Cinema Romance
Sky Cinema Romance, formerly Sky Cinema Passion, is the channel dedicated mainly to films of love, romance and passion, which started on the March 1, 2011.

Sky Cinema Drama
Sky Cinema Drama is the channel dedicated to dramas and biographies.

Sky Cinema Comedy
Sky Cinema Comedy is the channel dedicated to comedies, from international cult, Italian, American and British Comedy. The channel is started broadcasting on March 1, 2011, replacing Sky Cinema Italia.

References

External links
Sky Cinema on sky.it 

Sky Italia
Sky television channels
Italian-language television stations